Fucaria mystax is a species of sea snail, a marine gastropod mollusk in the family Skeneidae.

Description
The length of the shell attains 5.8 mm.

Distribution
This marine species occurs off hydrothermal vents of the Edison seamount (off Papua New Guinea) at a depth of 1483 m.

References

External links
 Warén A. & Bouchet P. (2001). Gastropoda and Monoplacophora from hydrothermal vents and seeps new taxa and records. The Veliger 44(2): 116-231

mystax
Gastropods described in 2001